is a 2001 Japanese erotic black comedy-horror film directed by Takashi Miike. It was filmed as the sixth and final part of the Love Cinema series consisting of six straight-to-video releases by independent filmmakers via a brief but exclusive run at the minuscule Shimokitazawa cinema in Tokyo. The six films were conceived as low budget exercises to explore the benefits afforded by the low-cost digital video medium such as the increased mobility of the camera and the low-lighting conditions available to the filmmakers.

Visitor Q often replicates the style of documentary footage and home movies, which invokes a sense of realism that contradicts the film's more bizarre elements and black comedy.

Plot
The film's plot is often compared to Pier Paolo Pasolini's Teorema, in which a strange visitor to a wealthy family seduces the maid, the son, the mother, the daughter, and finally the father, before leaving a few days after, subsequently changing their lives.

The film starts off with a question: "Have you ever done it with your Dad?"; the viewer then sees Miki Yamazaki, a young prostitute, trying to persuade her father, Kiyoshi, into having sex with her.  Her father is videotaping the scene for a documentary he is preparing on Japanese youths.  Once it appears the father is letting himself be persuaded, she tells him the price (50,000 Yen).  They have sex, the father ejaculates after a very short time, and the disappointed daughter informs him it will be 100,000 Yen now, because of this. The father then realizes the camera has been on all along.

In the next scene, called "Have you ever been hit on the head?", a man, the titular visitor, hits the father over the head with a rock for no apparent reason.

The film then moves on to a scene titled "Have you ever hit your mom?" In this scene, the mother, Keiko, is working on a jigsaw puzzle, and her hands are shown to have red marks, showing where she has been beaten.  Her teenage son, Takuya, comes in and starts throwing things at the already broken apartment walls because he is unhappy with the toothbrush his mother bought him.  He then hits his mother with a rug beater.  Later, bullies from the son's school come to the front of the house and shoot fireworks through the son's bedroom window, forcing him to cower on the floor. Meanwhile, the mother prepares and injects a dose of heroin.

On his way back from work, the father crosses paths with the visitor again, who hits him over the head with a rock as in their first encounter. The two arrive at the father's home, and the mother serves them dinner. The father announces that the visitor will be staying with the family for a while. The son comes down while they are eating and starts beating the mother again. This does not surprise or bother the father or the visitor. Later, the father is seen watching one of his old tapes, and it turns out that he was raped by a group of teenagers.

The next day, the father is on his way to work when he sees his son being beaten and robbed by some of his schoolmates. He films it from a distance and appears very pleased with the footage.

The mother, Keiko, is getting ready for work. The viewer discovers her body is covered in marks from where the son has hurt her. She also has a limp.

The father meets with a female co-worker (Asako Murata), who believes he is going too far in his work. The mother, working as a prostitute, is whipping a customer with a belt (at his request). She then goes to a park to buy some drugs.

When she gets home, she discovers the pieces from her jigsaw puzzle have been arranged so as to form a trail through the house, ending at a photograph of her daughter. The visitor is at home, and he introduces her to lactation sex (squeezing her nipples to make her lactate, a recurring theme in this film). The son sees this while hiding behind the door.

At dinner, the mother is much happier than usual and has prepared a nice meal. The son, however, is sullen and throws a bowl of hot soup at her face. The wife, instead of being downtrodden as usual, comes back with a carving knife and throws it at the head of her son, who dodges just in time. Everyone is very pleased, except the son, who is scared by his mother's sudden resolve. The father becomes exhilarated when his son's schoolmates start attacking his house with fireworks again, which he videotapes. The mother and the visitor continue to eat peacefully while the son cowers in terror as shards of glass and fragments of wood dislodged by the fireworks are strewn across the hallway.

Next day, the son is bullied again. The father is taping his son from his car with the visitor and his female co-worker. The co-worker gets fed up with the father and tries to leave. The father follows her on foot and sexually assaults her while the visitor, emotionally neutral, tapes the scene. The father unintentionally chokes his victim to death.

He takes her body back home and puts her in the greenhouse. The visitor is still taping, at the father's instruction. The father sends the visitor to get garbage bags from the mother. But when the visitor asks her for them, she takes her clothes off and reveals she is dressed in a garbage bag. She then makes herself lactate and produces a rain of human milk that covers the floor while the visitor watches from underneath an umbrella.

During this time, the husband is drawing on the woman's body to mark the best places to cut it up so the smaller pieces will fit in the bags. He tapes this for his documentary. Becoming aroused, the father has sex with the dead body. He then notices she is getting wet and is amazed that this is possible for a dead woman. When he brings his hand up, however, it is covered in feces. He then discovers that his penis is stuck inside the corpse due to rigor mortis. The mother comes out to help and rushes to the shop to buy several large bottles of vinegar. She empties the bottles into the bath with her husband and the corpse. This does not help, though, so she gives him a shot of heroin, which frees him. They are both exhilarated.

The visitor has filmed the whole scene.

Later on, the couple is having fun dismembering the female co-worker's corpse when the son turns up in the front yard with the same schoolmates beating him. The parents rush out, and with great pleasure they finally kill all the bullies using the saws and knives they were using to cut the co-worker's body to pieces. Later, their son is shown lying on the floor in the puddle of maternal milk. He thanks the visitor for bringing together the family through the chaos he brought.

With the issues he witnessed now seemingly resolved, the visitor leaves the house. While walking down a nearby street, he encounters the daughter, who propositions him. The visitor readies his rock to hit her on the head, and does so off-screen. Bruised by her encounter with the visitor, the daughter returns home to find her mother clad in a tarpaulin in the greenhouse, her father nursing from her mother’s breast. She smiles and joins them.

Cast
Kenichi Endō as Kiyoshi Yamazaki, the father
Shungicu Uchida as Keiko Yamazaki, the mother
Fujiko as Miki Yamazaki, the daughter
Jun Mutō as Takuya Yamazaki, the son
Kazushi Watanabe as Visitor Q
Shōko Nakahara as Asako Murata

References

External links
  Visitor Q at the Japanese Movie Database
 
 
 Visitor Q Review @ Revolving Video

2001 comedy-drama films
2001 films
Japanese black comedy films
Films about dysfunctional families
Films directed by Takashi Miike
Incest in film
Japanese avant-garde and experimental films
Japanese sex comedy films
Necrophilia in film
2000s Japanese films